Oh Han-ki (Korean: 오한기) is a South Korean writer. He was born in 1985 in Anyang, South Korea. He graduated in with a degree in creative writing from Dongguk University. His literary career began when his short story, "An Afternoon With a Folded Parasol" (Korean: 파라솔이 접힌 오후), won the Hyundae Literary Award in 2012. He has published a short-story collection called "The Way of the Righteous" (Korean: 의인법). He also won the 2016 Young Writer's Award. 

When Park Seongwon was a professor of fiction writing at Dongguk University's creative writing program, Oh studied under him and became a writer. He also met his literary partner Jeong Jidon, and formed the group ‘Analrealism’. Currently, Oh works in the marketing department of a coffee franchise. He writes fiction at night. However, it seems that he recently left this position.

Works

Short Story Collections 
 Impersonation (Korean: 의인법) Hyundae Munhak, 2015

Novels 
 The Man Who Became a Flamingo (Korean: 홍학이 된 사나이) Munhakdongne, 2016

Work in Translation 
 My Clint Eastwood (English)

Awards 
 2012 Hyundae Literary Award

Further reading 
 Seo, Hui-won, “Heterotopia’s Architects, Also Known as Hopeful Monsters – On the Short Fiction of Oh Han-ki and Jeong Ji-don”, Munhakdongne, Summer Issue, 2015.  
 Kwak, Yeong-bin, “Annotation and Criticism, Between Two Ruins – Analrealism and the Implosion of Criticism”, Literature and Society, Summer Issue, 2016.  
 Kim, So-yeon, Kim, Jeong-hwan, and Baek Ji-yeon, “Discussion: New Titles to Watch This Season“, Creation and Criticism, Spring 2016.  
 Lee, Su-hyeong, Lee, Sang-woo, and Oh Han-ki, “Strengths/Weaknesses”, Literature and Society, Summer Issue, 2013.

References

External links 
 “Impossible to Interpret or Regulate, The First Collections of Young Writers Born in the 80s”, Hankook Ilbo, 2015.  
 Lee Dongjin’s Red Library: Kim Jung-hyuk’s Shortcut Episode 19 – Writer Oh Han-ki 1, August 2016.  
 Lee Dongjin’s Red Library: Kim Jung-hyuk’s Shortcut Episode 20 – Writer Oh Han-ki 2, August 2016.  
 “Sarang”, Literatures, Winter Issue, 2015 – Oh Han-ki, This Month’s Fiction, January 2016, Moonji.

Living people
1985 births
South Korean male writers